Lluis Antón González (June 13, 1955 in Baíña, Mieres) is an Asturian actor, writer, and director.

A member of the theatrical group Telón de Fondo, he participated as an actor, director, and adaptor in many montages by the collective. As a film actor, he worked in many films made in the Asturias.

A militant Asturian independentist, he has been a participant in the movement for the recovery of the linguistic and social identity of the Asturias. He created and directed the cartoon magazine "El Llapiceru" edited by the Conceyu Bable-Xixón. In the year 2002, he published his first book Antón, el cantu´l cisne inspired by the works of Anton Chekhov.

References 

1955 births
Living people
Spanish male stage actors
Spanish male writers
Asturian language
Film directors from Asturias
People from Mieres, Asturias
Spanish male film actors